South Bend is a city in and the county seat of Pacific County, Washington, United States. The population was 1,637 as of the 2010 census. The town is widely-known for its oyster production and scenery.

History
South Bend was officially incorporated on September 27, 1890. The name of the city comes from its location on the Willapa River. The county seat was relocated from Oysterville to South Bend in 1893. The Pacific County Courthouse is on the National Register of Historic Places. The old South Bend Courthouse was the site of the first and only execution carried out in Pacific County, when convicted murderer Lum You was hanged in 1902.

Geography
South Bend is located at  (46.663477, -123.801176) on the Willapa river.

Climate

Demographics

2010 census
As of the census of 2010, there were 1,637 people, 684 households, and 414 families living in the city. The racial makeup of the city was 72.2% White, 0.2% African American, 3.4% Native American, 5.5% Asian, 13.3% from other races, and 5.4% from two or more races. Hispanic or Latino of any race were 19.4% of the population.

There were 684 households, of which 27.5% had children under the age of 18 living with them, 43.3% were married couples living together, 11.1% had a female householder with no husband present, 6.1% had a male householder with no wife present, and 39.5% were non-families. 33.8% of all households were made up of individuals, and 16.5% had someone living alone who was 65 years of age or older. The average household size was 2.31 and the average family size was 2.93.

The median age in the city was 43.9 years. 22.8% of residents were under the age of 18; 8.1% were between the ages of 18 and 24; 20.7% were from 25 to 44; 26.8% were from 45 to 64; and 21.7% were 65 years of age or older. The gender makeup of the city was 50.3% male and 49.7% female.

2000 census
As of the census of 2000, there were 1,807 people, 702 households, and 471 families living in the city.

The population density was 999.4 people per square mile (385.5/km2). There were 815 housing units at an average density of 450.7 per square mile (173.9/km2).

The racial makeup of the city was 83.45% White, 9.24% Hispanic or Latino, 4.93% Asian, 3.71% Native American, 0.17% African American, and 0.17% Pacific Islander. 3.76% identified themselves as some other race and 3.82% as two or more races. 17.7% were of German, 11.6% American, 9.1% Irish and 7.7% English ancestry according to Census 2000.

Of the 702 households, 52.3% consisted of married couples living together, 32.9% were non-family households, 29.5% contained children under the age of 18, 26.9% were made up of individuals only, 13.0% had someone living alone who was 65 years of age or older, and 10.0% had a female householder with no husband present. The average household size was 2.48 and the average family size was 3.02.

In the city, the population was spread out, with 26.4% under the age of 18, 7.7% from 18 to 24, 23.6% from 25 to 44, 24.1% from 45 to 64, and 18.2% who were 65 years of age or older. The median age was 39 years. For every 100 females, there were 94.9 males. For every 100 females age 18 and over, there were 94.7 males.

The median income for a household in the city was $29,211, and the median income for a family was $35,221. Males had a median income of $35,069 versus $23,906 for females. The per capita income for the city was $14,776. About 12.8% of families and 18.3% of the population were below the poverty line, including 25.5% of those under age 18 and 6.5% of those age 65 or over.

Notable natives
 Helen Davis – Composer of "Washington, My Home", the state song of Washington since 1959
 Helen Kleeb – Actress who played Miss Mamie Baldwin in The Waltons
 Pat Paulsen – Comedian and satirist
 Allen Winbeck – United States Coast Guard Rear Admiral

See also
 Willapa Bay
 Steamboats of Willapa Bay
 Frederick Copenspire

References

External links

 Official City Website
 Pacific County Historical Society and Museum
 South Bend Public Schools

Cities in Washington (state)
County seats in Washington (state)
Cities in Pacific County, Washington
1890 establishments in Washington (state)